Georg von Engelhardt (Russian:Его́р Анто́нович Энгельга́рдт; 1775-1862) was a Russian statesman, and a noted member of the Baltic-German Engelhardt family.

Biography
He was born in Riga. He went to Saint Petersburg in 1790 and six years later secured a post in the Department of Foreign Affairs. He became Undersecretary of State in 1801 under Alexander I in the newly created Imperial Council. He was made director of the Pedagogical Institute in 1811 and of the Lyceum at Tsarskoye Selo in 1816. His liberalism, however, led to his removal in 1823.

Literary work
From 1838 to 1852 he edited the Russische Landwirtschaftliche Zeitung (“Russian Agricultural News”). He published Russische Miscellan zur Kenntnis Russlands und seiner Bewohner (“Russian miscellany of facts about Russia and its inhabitants,” 4 vols., 1828–32) and edited the manuscript journals of the explorer Ferdinand von Wrangel, which he issued in Reise längs der Nordküste von Sibirien und auf dem Eismeer (“Trip along the north coast of Siberia and the Arctic Ocean,” 1839).

Notes

References

 

1775 births
1862 deaths
Editors from the Russian Empire
Writers from the Russian Empire
People from the Russian Empire of German descent
Georg